185638 Erwinschwab, provisional designation , is a potentially sub-kilometer Nysian asteroid from the inner regions of the asteroid belt. It was discovered on 1 March 2008, by OAM-astronomers at the La Sagra Observatory in southern Spain. The asteroid is estimated to measure between 950 meters and 1.8 kilometers in diameter and was named after German astronomer Erwin Schwab in 2009.

Orbit and classification 

Erwinschwab is a member of the Nysa family, the main belt's largest asteroid family with nearly 20 thousand members. The family also known as the Nysa-Polana complex, consisting of several distinct subfamilies.

The asteroid orbits the Sun in the inner main-belt at a distance of 2.0–2.8 AU once every 3 years and 8 months (1,342 days). Its orbit has an eccentricity of 0.16 and an inclination of 3° with respect to the ecliptic.

Physical characteristics 

The asteroid's spectral type is unknown. The Nysa family complex consist of S-, F- and C-type asteroids (SFC).

Diameter and albedo 

Erwinschwab has not been observed by any space-based telescope such as the Infrared Astronomical Satellite IRAS, the Japanese Akari satellite or the NEOWISE mission of NASA's Wide-field Infrared Survey Explorer. Based on an assumed albedo of 0.20, which is typical for silicaceous asteroid, the asteroid measures 0.95 kilometers in diameter for an absolute magnitude of 17.5. Since members of the Nysa family complex also include carbonaceous asteroid, Erwinschwabs albedo may also be estimated at 0.057, which translates into a larger diameter of 1.8 kilometers.

Rotation period 

As of 2017, no rotational lightcurve of Erwinschwab has been obtained from photometric observations. The body's rotation period, pole axis and shape remain unknown.

Naming 

This minor planet was named after German amateur astronomer Erwin Schwab (born 1964), a prolific discoverer of minor planets at the Starkenburg Observatory, Tzec Maun and Taunus observatories since the early 1980s. During his astrometric observation at Taunus, Schwab has collaborated with astronomer Rainer Kling. The official naming citation was published by the Minor Planet Center on 7 June 2009.

References

External links 
 Asteroid Lightcurve Database (LCDB), query form (info )
 Dictionary of Minor Planet Names, Google books
 Asteroids and comets rotation curves, CdR – Observatoire de Genève, Raoul Behrend
 Discovery Circumstances: Numbered Minor Planets (185001)-(190000) – Minor Planet Center
 
 

185638
185638
Named minor planets
20080301